The non-marine mollusks of Kyrgyzstan are a part of the molluscan fauna of Kyrgyzstan (wildlife of Kyrgyzstan). A number of species of non-marine mollusks are found in the wild in Kyrgyzstan.

Freshwater gastropods

Hydrobiidae
 Pseudocaspia issykkulensis (Clessin, 1894)
 Chirgisia alaarchaensis Glöer, Boeters & Pešić, 2014

Valvatidae
 Valvata piscinalis (O. F. Müller, 1774)
 Valvata macrostoma Mörch, 1864

Lymnaeidae
 Lymnaea stagnalis (Linnaeus, 1758)
 Lymnaea kashmirensis Prashad, 1925
 Radix auricularia (Linnaeus, 1758)
 Radix ovata (Draparnaud, 1805)
 Radix cf. hookeri (Reeve, 1850)
 Radix obliquata (Martens, 1864)
 Radix lagotis (Schrank, 1803)
 Radix balthica (Linnaeus, 1758)
 Galba truncatula (O. F. Müller, 1774)

Planorbidae
 Planorbis planorbis (Linnaeus, 1758)
 Planorbis carinatus O. F. Müller, 1774
 Planorbis intermixtus Mousson, 1874
 Anisus issykulensis (Clessin, 1907)
 Gyraulus acutus Clessin, 1907
 Gyraulus acronicus (A. Férussac, 1807)
 Gyraulus laevis (Alder, 1838)
 Gyraulus chinensis (Dunker, 1848)
 Planorbarius corneus (Linnaeus, 1758)

Acroloxidae
 Ancylastrum ovatum Clessin, 1907
 Ancylastrum issykulense Clessin, 1907
 Ancylastrum turkestanicum Clessin, 1907
 Ancylastrum dextrorsum Clessin, 1907

Physidae
 Physella acuta (Draparnaud, 1805)

Land gastropods

Bradybaenidae
 Fruticicola lantzi (Lindholm, 1927)
 Fruticicola sinistrorsa Tsvetkov, 1938

Freshwater bivalves

Sphaeriidae
 Pisidium casertanum (Poli, 1791)
 Pisidium obtusale (Lamarck, 1818)

See also
 List of non-marine molluscs of China
 List of non-marine molluscs of Kazakhstan
 List of non-marine molluscs of Tajikistan
 List of non-marine molluscs of Uzbekistan

References

Molluscs
Kyrgyzstan
Kyrgyzstan